Bolshetenkashevo (Olo Teñkäş) is a rural locality (a village) in Baygildinsky Selsoviet, Nurimanovsky District, Bashkortostan, Russia. The population was 320 as of 2010. There are 7 streets.

Geography 
Bolshetenkashevo is located 27 km southwest of Krasnaya Gorka (the district's administrative centre) by road. Malotenkashevo is the nearest rural locality.

References 

Rural localities in Nurimanovsky District